Kim Young-hee, also spelled Kim Yeong-hui, is a Korean name consisting of the family name Kim and the given name Young-hee, and may also refer to:

 Kim Yeong-hui (speed skater) (born 1955), South Korean speed skater
 Kim Yeong-hui (rower) (born 1962), South Korean rower
 Kim Young-hee (basketball) (1963–2023), South Korean basketball player
 Kim Young-hee (comedian) (born 1983), South Korean comedian

See also
 Kim Yong-hee (disambiguation)